Goin' to Kansas City is an album by American jazz trumpeter Buck Clayton with Tommy Gwaltney's Kansas City 9 featuring tracks recorded in late 1960 for the Riverside label.

Reception

Allmusic awarded the album 4 stars with the review by Scott Yanow stating, "Although the nonet performs a variety of songs associated with Kansas City Jazz of the swing era, the arrangements are modern and unpredictable".

Track listing
 "Hello Babe" (Dicky Wells) - 3:00     
 "An Old Manuscript" (Andy Razaf, Don Redman) - 3:26     
 "Kansas City Ballad" (Tommy Newsom) - 3:06     
 "The Jumping Blues" (Jay McShann, Charlie Parker) - 4:07     
 "Walter Page" (Tommy Gwaltney) - 4:27     
 "Midnight Mama" (Jelly Roll Morton) - 4:39     
 "John's Idea" (Count Basie, Eddie Durham) - 3:05     
 "Steppin' Pretty" (Mary Lou Williams) - 3:12     
 "Dedicated to You" (Sammy Cahn, Saul Chaplin, Hy Zaret) - 3:34     
 "The New Tulsa Blues" (Bennie Moten) - 4:37

Personnel 
Buck Clayton - trumpet
Bobby Zottola - trumpet, peck horn
Dicky Wells - trombone
Tommy Newsom - clarinet, tenor saxophone
Tommy Gwaltney - alto saxophone, clarinet, vibraphone, xylophone
John Bunch - piano
Charlie Byrd - guitar
Whitey Mitchell - bass
Buddy Schutz - drums
Technical
Phil Ramone - engineer

Landmark 
After an urban renewal project in the 1960s, Vine Street no longer intersects 12th Street, but at the former intersection the city created the Goin' to Kansas City Plaza.

References 

1960 albums
Riverside Records albums
Buck Clayton albums